Ebrahimabad-e Olya (also Romanized as Ebrāhīmābād-e ‘Olyā) is a village in Meyami Rural District, in the Central District of Meyami County, Semnan Province, Iran. At the 2006 census, its population was 1,022, in 263 families.

References 

Populated places in Meyami County